Svetozar Obradović Toza (12 November 1950 – 15 August 2020) was a Serbian writer, best known for his comic books. He also wrote articles, essays, stories, books and radio dramas.

Professional career
Obradović debuted with Lieutenant Tara in the Yugoslav Zlatni kliker magazine in 1975. The titular hero was named and loosely based on his uncle, who fought as a Partisan in World War II. The comic was drawn by Obradović's childhood friend, Branislav Kerac. The duo went on to create Kobra and Cat Claw, two of the most popular Yugoslav books in the 1980s. Obradović also worked with different artists on licensed properties such as Tarzan and Blek as well as Ninja and Lun, kralj ponoći, based on the popular pulp novels. His work has been reprinted in the US, Germany, Scandinavia and the Netherlands.

Personal life
Obradović's father was originally from Pljevlja (presently Montenegro) but moved to Novi Sad after World War II, where Obradović was born and lived with his wife and two daughters. He was also a basketball player and coach.

Bibliography

Comics
 Lieutenant Tara (art by Branislav Kerac)
 Kobra (art by Branislav Kerac)
 Cat Claw (art by Branislav Kerac)
 Billy The Spit (art by Branislav Kerac)
 Troje nesalomljivih (art by Branislav Kerac)
 Blek (art by various)
 Lun, kralj ponoći (art by various)
 Izvidnik Rod (art by Jelko Peternelj)
 Kiki i Riki (art by Pavel Koza)
 Porodica Srećković (art by Sibin Slavković)
Ninja (art by various)

Books
 Velike prevare i falsifikati
 Novosadski strip

Sources

1950 births
2020 deaths
20th-century Serbian writers
21st-century Serbian writers
Writers from Novi Sad
Serbian comics writers